Pseudomeritastis is a genus of moths belonging to the subfamily Tortricinae of the family Tortricidae.

Species
Pseudomeritastis clarkei Obraztsov, 1966
Pseudomeritastis cordigera (Walsingham, 1914)
Pseudomeritastis decora Obraztsov, 1966
Pseudomeritastis distincta Obraztsov, 1966
Pseudomeritastis emphanes Razowski, 2004
Pseudomeritastis heliadelpha (Meyrick, 1932)
Pseudomeritastis orphnoxantha Obraztsov, 1966
Pseudomeritastis quieta Razowski & Wojtusiak, 2010
Pseudomeritastis voluta (Meyrick, 1912)

See also
List of Tortricidae genera

References

 , 2005: World catalogue of insects volume 5 Tortricidae.
 , 1966, Proc. U.S. natn. Mus. 118: 222.
 , 2010: Tortricidae (Lepidoptera) from Peru. Acta Zoologica Cracoviensia 53B (1-2): 73-159. . Full article: .

External links
tortricidae.com

Euliini
Tortricidae genera